The Prag Cine Awards 2014 ceremony, presented by the Prag Network, honored the actors, technical achievements, and films censored in 2013 from Assam and took place on March 22, 2014, at the Koramangala Indoor Stadium in Bangalore, India. Actors duos Kopil Bora and Zerifa Wahid hosted the show. Veteran litterateur Arun Sharma, Kannada film directorNagathihalli Chandrashekhar and Bollywood film actress Mahima Chaudhary inaugurated the event.

Actor Mridula Barua was honoured with the lifetime Achievement Award for her contribution towards the Assamese film Industry. Actor Adil Hussain received best actor award for Raag and the best actress award has gone to Jaya Seal Ghose for Sringkhal. Jahnu Barua directed Ajeyo won the best film award.

Winners and nominees 
The nominees for the Prag Cine Awards 2014 were announced on March 3, 2014. In this edition, awards are given in 23 categories to the Assamese and non-Assamese films produced from Assam and censored in the year of 2013. Raag topped the nomination list with twelve nominations, followed by Ajeyo and Shinyor tied for the second place with eleven each.

Awards 

Winners are listed first and highlighted in boldface.

Lifetime achievement award 
Actor Mridula Barua was honoured with the lifetime Achievement Award for her contribution towards the Assamese film Industry.

Other awards 
 Best Writing on Cinema: Farhana Ahmed
 Jury's Special Mention: Kenny Basumatary – Local Kung Fu

See also 
List of Assamese films of the 2010s

References 

Cinema of Assam
2013 Indian film awards